Lilian Studer ( born 20 December 1977) is a Swiss politician. She currently serves as a member of the National Council (Switzerland) for the Evangelical People's Party since 2 December 2019. Since 2021, she also serves as the president of the Evangelical People's Party of Switzerland.

Early life and education 
Studer was born 20 December 1977, in Baden, Switzerland to Heiner and Marit (née Andestad) Studer. Her father was also a former member of the National Council (Switzerland) between 1999 and 2007, and a former member of the Grand Council of Aargau. Her mother is from Norway. Studer is a Swiss-Norwegian dual citizen. She was raised in Wettingen and became a teacher for textile handcrafts at local secondary schools. In 2000, she volunteered in Honduras, before becoming a teacher at the Dietikon schools.

Career 
Between 2001 and 2012, Studer worked as a teacher for textile handcrafts at the local schools, in Wettingen. Studer was the managing director of Blaues Kreuz Aargau between 2014 and 2021. Since 2021 she is the president of the Evangelical People's Party of Switzerland.

Politics 
In 2002, Studer was elected into Grand Council of Aargau, succeeding Elsbeth Zimmermann. Studer was ultimately elected into National Council (Switzerland) in the 2019 Swiss federal election on 20 October 2019. She assumed office on 2 December 2019.

References 

Living people
1977 births
21st-century Swiss politicians
21st-century Swiss women politicians
Evangelical People's Party of Switzerland politicians
Members of the National Council (Switzerland)
Women members of the National Council (Switzerland)
Swiss people of Norwegian descent
People from Baden